The 1978 Afro-Asian Cup of Nations was the first edition of the Afro-Asian Cup of Nations, it was contested by Ghana, winners of the 1978 African Cup of Nations, and Iran, winners of the 1976 AFC Asian Cup. The tournament planned to be played into two legs. The first leg was played in Tehran and Iran beat Ghana 3–0. However the second leg which was normally played in Accra was cancelled due to the Iranian Revolution.

Qualified teams

Match details

First leg

Second leg

The trophy was not awarded, because the second leg was cancelled.

References

External links
1978 Afro-Asian Cup of Nations - rsssf.com
1978 Afro-Asian Cup of Nations - teammelli.com

Afro-Asian Cup of Nations
Mer
Mer
1977–78 in Iranian football
International association football competitions hosted by Iran
Iran national football team matches
Ghana national football team matches
May 1978 sports events in Asia